Mark Robert Rypien (born October 2, 1962) is a Canadian former professional football player who was a quarterback for 14 seasons in the National Football League (NFL). He played college football at Washington State and was drafted by the Washington Redskins in the sixth round of the 1986 NFL Draft. He was the first Canadian-born quarterback to both start in the NFL and be named Super Bowl MVP, doing so in Super Bowl XXVI with the Redskins. He also played for several other NFL teams. His nephew Brett plays in the NFL for the Denver Broncos.

Early years
Born in Calgary, Alberta, Rypien moved to the United States in 1965 and was raised in Spokane, Washington.    He was a star three-sport athlete at Shadle Park High School. All three of his varsity numbers (football, basketball, and baseball) were later retired by the school.

He accepted a football scholarship to Washington State University in Pullman, and joined the Delta Tau Delta fraternity. A knee injury in spring drills in 1982 redshirted him for that season and he nearly left football and WSU in November 1983. After a good showing as a late replacement to the roster in the Senior Bowl, he was selected by the Washington Redskins in the sixth round of the 1986 NFL Draft, the 146th overall pick and the eighth quarterback selected.

Professional career

Washington Redskins
Rypien spent his first two years as a professional on the Redskins' injured reserved list, first with a bad knee in 1986, then a bad back in 1987. He watched from the sidelines as the Redskins won Super Bowl XXII under coach Joe Gibbs in January 1988 behind the quarterbacking of veteran Doug Williams.

Rypien became the second stringer after Jay Schroeder, who lost his job to Williams late in the 1987 season, was traded to the Los Angeles Raiders. In Week 4 against the newly relocated Phoenix Cardinals, Rypien got his first chance to start for an injured Williams and threw for 303 yards and two touchdowns in a 30-21 loss. In six starts, he went 3-3 and he appeared in nine games overall, including a four-touchdown game in a rematch against the Cardinals. He threw for 1,730 yards in those games and finished with three more touchdowns than Williams had, by a count of 18–15. 

Rypien was named the starter for 1989 ahead of the injured and aging Williams, Rypien emerged as a star quarterback as he threw for 3,768 yards with 22 touchdowns and led the Redskins to a 10-6 record. The team missed the playoffs but Rypien received a bid as an injury replacement for Joe Montana and Don Majkowski in that year's Pro Bowl (NFC coach John Robinson elected to bring only one injury replacement for his intended starter and #2 quarterback).

Rypien was best known for his phenomenal accuracy as a deep passer.

A running joke among sportswriters in Washington was that Rypien could only throw "ducks" in a ten-yard game of catch going during warmups, but threw such a beautiful, accurate deep ball that from 60 yards away, he could play catch with someone sitting down. According to former head coach Joe Gibbs, "Rypien's sideline throws would wobble and didn't look all that pretty. But that man could seriously throw the deep stuff." A 1992 Sport Magazine article touted him as one of the best deep passers ever.

The 1991 season was Rypien's best: he threw for 3,564 yards and 28 touchdowns with 11 interceptions, leading the Redskins to Super Bowl XXVI after recording a 14–2 regular season record. He was named the MVP (Most Valuable Player) of the game, passing for 292 yards and 2 touchdowns and leading his team to a 37–24 win over the Buffalo Bills. Rypien, a native of Calgary, Alberta, Canada, became the first foreign-born player to earn the honor. Rypien was named to the Pro Bowl in both 1989 and 1991.

Rypien was one of several players to benefit from the team's success following their championship season. The Redskins signed him to a 3-year, $9 million deal entering the 1992 season. However, the team battled age and injuries and finished the regular season with a 9–7 record, barely making the playoffs. His passing yardage was a respectable 3,282 yards, but his passer rating fell from 97.9 in 1991 to 71.7 in 1992 and his interceptions outnumbered his touchdowns 17–13. Although a dominant team performance in the playoffs brought victory over the Minnesota Vikings in an NFC Wild Card away game, the Redskins eventually lost on a rainy, muddy field in a bruising game vs. the San Francisco 49ers, and the Rypien era was essentially over. Under new head coach Richie Petitbon, Rypien had his best training camp in 1993 and expectations were high following a Monday Night win over the defending Super Bowl Champion Dallas Cowboys. However, Rypien injured his knee in Week 2 against the Arizona Cardinals and the team began a precipitous slide toward a 4–12 season finish.

When he was healthy enough to return, Rypien performed spot duty, sharing time with the newly acquired Rich Gannon. The Redskins hired Norv Turner as their head coach in 1994. Rypien participated in offseason workouts, but the team later released him.

Cleveland Browns
On May, 11, 1994, Rypien signed with the Cleveland Browns to backup Vinny Testaverde. He played in six games for the Browns that year, starting three of them. In those three games he went 2–1, including a 26–7 win over the Eagles.

St. Louis Rams
On May 6, 1995, Rypien signed with the St. Louis Rams, this time to backup Chris Miller. He started the final three games of the season, going 0–3 in that span to finish a disappointing season for the team. He had his best performance against the Buffalo Bills in his first start where he went 31 of 55 for 372 yards and two touchdowns despite the team's 27–45 loss to Jim Kelly.

Philadelphia Eagles
On October 3, 1996, Rypien signed with the Philadelphia Eagles due to an injury to starter Rodney Peete. His last NFL touchdown pass came in relief of Eagles quarterback Ty Detmer, an 8-yarder to Irving Fryar with five seconds remaining in a 37-10 loss to the Indianapolis Colts.

St. Louis Rams (second stint)
On March 4, 1997, Rypien resigned with the Rams. He played in five games and did not score any touchdowns.

Atlanta Falcons 
He signed with the Atlanta Falcons for the 1998 season but never played in Atlanta. His son's death from a malignant brain tumor that August caused Rypien to retire.

Indianapolis Colts
After a three-year hiatus, Rypien unretired and signed with the Indianapolis Colts on August 1, 2001. He would appear in four games for the Colts. He made his first appearance in week three against the New England Patriots in relief of Peyton Manning. He would complete and attempt his only passes of the season that game going five of nine for 57 yards in the 13–44 loss.

Seattle Seahawks 
On August 19, 2002, Rypien signed with the Seattle Seahawks to be the backup for Matt Hasselbeck and Trent Dilfer. He played in two preseason games and finished thirteen of 21 passing for 97 yards, but was ultimately cut on September 3, 2002.

Rochester Raiders 
Rypien's last professional game was on June 10, 2006; as part of a promotional gig for the Rochester Raiders of the Great Lakes Indoor Football League (GLIFL).

In 11 NFL seasons, Rypien completed 1,466 of 2,613 passes for 18,473 yards and 115 touchdowns, with 88 interceptions. He rushed 127 times for 166 yards and 8 touchdowns.

NASCAR

Rypien had a brief stint in NASCAR racing as a team owner, and was the original owner of the 2004 Nextel Cup championship-winning No. 97 team driven by Kurt Busch, having sold it to Jack Roush's Roush Racing in 1997.

NFL career statistics

Regular season

Personal life
On June 8, 2006, Rypien was inducted into the National Polish-American Sports Hall of Fame.

Rypien's cousins include NHL players Rick Rypien and Shane Churla, and his nephew is NFL quarterback Brett Rypien.

Rypien's daughter, Angela, played the 2011 season for the Seattle Mist of the Lingerie Football League; she is currently playing for the LFL's Baltimore Charm.

An avid golfer, Rypien has been known to participate in charity tournaments at various locations across the nation. He has played in one PGA Tour event (Kemper Open in 1992), and one Web.com Tour event (Buy.com Tri-Cities Open in 2000), and missed the 36-hole cut by a substantial margin both times.

He has been a regular competitor at the American Century Championship, the annual competition at Lake Tahoe to determine the best golfers among American sports and entertainment celebrities. Rypien won the inaugural event in 1990, and won his second crown 24 years later in 2014; he has a total of 11 top ten finishes. Televised by NBC in July, the tournament is played at Edgewood Tahoe Golf Course in Stateline, Nevada.

In a 2018 interview with the Spokane Spokesman-Review, Rypien's wife stated that she believes he is suffering from chronic traumatic encephalopathy (CTE) from his years of playing football, with bizarre behavior occurring from time to time. Rypien himself confirmed that he has struggled with mental health issues since his retirement from football, even attempting to take his own life by overdosing on pills before his wife stopped him. On June 30, 2019, he was arrested on suspicion of domestic violence and was charged with fourth-degree assault. The charge was dismissed on August 30, 2019.

In 2020, he was featured in the documentary "Quiet Explosions: Healing the Brain" produced and directed by Jerri Sher.

References

Sources

External links

1962 births
Living people
American football quarterbacks
American people of Finnish descent
American people of Polish descent
Atlanta Falcons players
Canadian emigrants to the United States 
Canadian expatriate American football people in the United States
Canadian football quarterbacks
Canadian people of Finnish descent
Canadian people of Polish descent
Canadian players of American football
Cleveland Browns players
Ed Block Courage Award recipients
Indianapolis Colts players
NASCAR team owners
National Conference Pro Bowl players
Philadelphia Eagles players
Players of American football from Spokane, Washington
Rochester Raiders players
Seattle Seahawks players
Canadian football people from Calgary
St. Louis Rams players
Super Bowl MVPs
Washington Redskins players
Washington State Cougars football players